Samqavor (also Romanized as Samqāvor and Samqāvar; also known as Şam‘ Āvar, Şamghāvar, and Shūm Qāwar) is a village in Khenejin Rural District, in the Central District of Komijan County, Markazi Province, Iran. At the 2006 census, its population was 1,919, in 548 families.

References 

Populated places in Komijan County